Adlersparrefjorden is a fjord of Nordaustlandet, Svalbard, an eastern branch of Duvefjorden at the northern coast. It has a length of about 10 kilometers, and has three branches. A land tongue of 0.5 kilometers separates the fjord from Finn Malmgren Fjord at the eastern side of Glenhalvøya. Adlersparrefjorden is named after naval officer Axel Adlersparre.

References

Fjords of Svalbard
Nordaustlandet